Sabah Bizi (born 13 November 1946) is an Albanian retired footballer who played for Vllaznia Shkodër and Partizani Tirana as well as the Albania national team.

Club career
A Vllaznia club legend, Bizi won three league titles with the club during their most successful period in the 1970s, when he played alongside Ramazan Rragami among others, and also one with Partizani. When he joined the military, he was forced to play for army club Partizani. After three years in the army, he rejoined Vllaznia against the wishes of Partizani, At the time, one of the communist regime's top leaders visited Shkodër to see how a hydroelectric power station was being built and the workers involved in the construction demanded the return of Bizi to Vllaznia on condition that they complete the hydropower plant before the deadline. In the end, a deal was reached and Bizi ended his career at Vllaznia.

International career
He made his debut for Albania in an April 1967 European Championship qualification match away against West Germany and earned a total of 15 caps, scoring 1 goal. His final international was a November 1976 friendly match against Algeria.

Personal life
His son Brikeno also played for Vllaznia, winning two league titles in the 1990s.

Honours
Kategoria Superiore: 4
 1971, 1972, 1974, 1978

References

External links

1946 births
Living people
Footballers from Shkodër
Albanian footballers
Association football midfielders
Albania under-23 international footballers
Albania international footballers
KF Vllaznia Shkodër players
FK Partizani Tirana players
Albanian football managers
KF Vllaznia Shkodër managers
Kategoria Superiore players
Kategoria Superiore managers